The grammar of the Belarusian language is mostly synthetic and partly analytic, and norms of the modern language were adopted in 1959. Belarusian orthography is constructed on the phonetic principle ("you write down what you hear") and is mainly based on the Belarusian folk dialects of the Minsk-Vilnius region, such as they were at the beginning of the 20th century. Initially, Belarusian grammar was formalised by notable Belarusian linguist Branislaw Tarashkyevich and first printed in Vil'nya (1918). Historically, there had existed several other alternative Belarusian grammars.

See also: Belarusian alphabet, Belarusian phonology, History of the Belarusian language.

Features

Grammatical system
The main means of representation of the grammatical meanings in the Belarusian language are:
 affixes — "стол – стала", "кідаць – кінуць";
 suppletivism — "я – мяне", "чалавек – людзі", "браць – узяць";
 intonation — "ён гэта зрабіў – ён гэта зрабіў?";
 function words — "чытаў бы", "будзеш ведаць";
 root combining — "хадзіцьму = хадзіць+іму – маю хадзіць";
 reduplication — "белы-белы";
 order of words — "цікавая кніга – кніга цікавая".

Methods of analytical construction are also present. E.g., the word "лесам", which is the instrumental of "лес" — forest, may grammatically mean:
 circumstance, if used with verbs of motion  — "ехаць лесам";
 specification, if together with other verbs  — "валодаць лесам".

Nouns

There are six cases in Belarusian:
 Nominative
 Genitive
 Dative
 Accusative
 Instrumental
 Locative
Historically, there also existed a vocative case, but it is used only sparingly in modern Belarusian, like Slovene, Slovak and the closely related Russian, generally in literature, and usually is not mentioned in textbooks.

For nouns there are several types of declension:
 i-stem – feminine (feminine nouns ending in a hard consonant, soft consonant or ў: печ "stove", косць "bone", кроў "blood")

 a-stem – mostly feminine (subdivided into four subgroups: hard stems, guttural stems, soft stems, hardened stems)
 o-stem – masculine (subdivided into hard stem and soft stem) and neuter (вясло "oar", мора "sea")
 consonantal stem – mostly neuter (ягня "lamb", бярэмя "burden", семя "seed")
 irregular nouns (for example, вока "eye" and вуха "ear")

Pronouns
There are eight types of pronouns (BGN/PCGN: zaymyenniki) in Belarusian:

 Personal (асабовыя): 

 Interrogative-comparative (пытальныя):

які (which), каторы (which), чый (whose), колькі (how much)

 Demonstrative (указальныя):

той (that); такі, гэтакі (such, of this kind); столькі, гэтулькі (that much)

 Possessive (прыналежныя):

 Negative (адмоўныя): ніхто (nobody), нішто (nothing), нічый (nobody's), ніякі (not of any kind), ніводзін, ніводны (no one);
 Definitive (азначальныя): сам (-self); самы (the very, – self); увесь (all, whole); усё (all, everything); усе (all, every, everybody); усякі, усялякі (every, any); кожны (each); іншы (other).
 Indefinite (няпэўныя): нехта, хтосьці (someone, somebody); нешта, штосьці (something); нечы, чыйсьці (someone's, somebody's, a); некаторы (some of); некалькі (a few, some, several); нейкі, якісьці (some, a kind of, something like); хто-небудзь, хто-колечы (anybody); што-небудзь, што-колечы (anything); чый-небудзь (anybody's); абы-што (smth. dickey); абы-чый (a, somebody's (negative)); абы-які (dickey).
 Interrogative-comparative (пытальныя): хто (who), што (what), які (which), каторы (which), чый (whose), колькі (how much);

Note: proper names and places’ names are rendered in BGN/PCGN

Sources
 Беларуская граматыка. У 2-х ч. / АН БССР, Ін-т мовазнаўства імя Я. Коласа; [Рэд. М. В. Бірыла, П. П. Шуба]. – Мн. : Навука і тэхніка, 1985.

 
Grammar